Měchenice is a municipality and village in Prague-West District in the Central Bohemian Region of the Czech Republic. It has about 800 inhabitants. It lies on the left bank of Vltava river, 25 km south from centre of Prague.

History

Měchenice is one of the oldest settlements in Bohemia. The first written mention of Měchenice is from 999 when Duke Boleslaus II donated Měchenice to the Ostrov Monastery.

Sport
In 1927 the football club AFK Měchenice was founded, in 1985 the tennis club was founded.

References

External links

 (in Czech)

Villages in Prague-West District